Park Soo-young (born September 3, 1996), known by the stage name Joy, is a South Korean singer, actress, and host. She debuted as a member of South Korean girl group Red Velvet in August 2014. In 2017, Joy debuted as an actress and has had starring roles in the television dramas The Liar and His Lover (2017), Tempted (2018), The One and Only (2021), and Once Upon a Small Town (2022).

In 2021, Joy officially debuted as a soloist with the release of her special album Hello.

Early life 
Park Soo-young was born in Jeju Island and raised in Dobong, Seoul. She is the eldest of three sisters. As a child, Joy was interested in modern trot music and was influenced to become a singer after receiving praise for her rendition of Korean rock band Cherry Filter's song "Flying Duck" during a grade school festival. Joy auditioned and was cast by SM Entertainment at the SM Global Audition in Seoul in 2012.

Career

2014–present: Debut and group activities 

Following two years of training, a vocal coach gave her the stage name "Joy". Joy was officially introduced as the fourth member of Red Velvet on July 29, 2014. Joy was the only member of the group who was not introduced as a part of SM Rookies, a pre-debut training team created by SM Entertainment. Red Velvet made their debut in August 2014 with the digital single "Happiness". Over the course of their promotion, the group established themselves as one of the most powerful celebrities in South Korea by Forbes Korea Power Celebrity in 2018 and 2019, and gained global popularity with Billboard regarding them as one of the most popular K-pop groups worldwide.

2015–2020: Solo activities

In June 2015, Joy began her first solo television activity with the fourth season of MBC variety show We Got Married, where she was paired with BtoB member Yook Sung-jae. Joy gained recognition for her participation and won the New Star Award and Best Couple Award at the 2015 MBC Entertainment Awards. Joy also released a duet with Yook entitled "Young Love" in April 2016, with Joy receiving a songwriting credit for the song. Departing in May 2016, they became known as one of the longest-running and most popular couples in the show's history.

In November 2016, Joy collaborated with Lim Seul-ong in a duet titled "Always In My Heart". The song reached number one on several charts and number ten on the Gaon Digital Chart.

In 2017, Joy made her acting debut as the female lead in tvN's music-based drama The Liar and His Lover, a South Korean adaptation of Kotomi Aoki's popular manga Kanojo wa Uso o Aishisugiteru. With the drama's musical nature, Joy released several OSTs including: "Yeowooya", "I'm Okay", "Your Days", "Shiny Boy", "Waiting For You", and "The Way to Me". For her performance as lead actress, Joy received the Newcomer Award at the OSEN Cable TV Awards. In July 2017, Joy participated on the singing variety contest show King of Mask Singer under the alias of Bandabi, where she made it through to the next round of the competition.

In 2018, Joy began her first fixed hosting position as the co-host of the second season of JTBC's Sugar Man alongside top TV personalities Yoo Jae-suk, You Hee-yeol, and Park Na-rae. In 2018, Joy starred in MBC's drama Tempted, loosely based on the French novel Les Liaisons dangereuses, and recorded its OST "OMG!". Joy received numerous award nominations for her performance including: Best Actress at the 2018 MBC Drama Awards, and the Popularity Award (Drama Actress) at The Seoul Awards. In July 2018, Joy was chosen as one of the hosts of Lifetime's new variety show Pajama Friends, alongside Song Ji-hyo and Jang Yoon-ju. Later that year in October 2018, Joy released the soundtrack song "Dream Me" (with Mark Lee) for the KBS drama The Ghost Detective.

In January 2019, it was announced that Joy was chosen to be a main host of the popular beauty program OnStyle's Get It Beauty, with former Pajama Friends co-host, Jang Yoon-ju. In December 2019, Joy became part of the athletic variety show, Handsome Tigers, as the manager of Seo Jang-hoon's basketball team composed of celebrities such as Lee Sang-yoon and Cha Eun-woo. After positive response in variety shows, Joy won the Best Female Variety Idol Award at the 2020 Brand Customer Loyalty Awards.

In March 2020, Joy released her solo OST "Introduce Me a Good Person" for the soundtrack of tvN's drama Hospital Playlist. The song reached number one on multiple charts, number five on the Billboard K-Pop Hot 100 Chart, number six on the Gaon Digital Chart, and has surpassed 500 Million Digital Index Points on Gaon. In April 2020, Joy next participated alongside prominent Korean artists in the multi-collaboration project "Evergreen Tree" to support medical professionals during the COVID-19 pandemic. In May 2020, Joy featured on the lead single of R&B artist Crush, with "Mayday" topping the charts on several Korean music platforms. "Introduce Me a Good Person" went on to be nominated for the Song of the Year Daesang (Grand Prize) and Best OST Award at the Mnet Asian Music Awards, and Best OST at the 30th Seoul Music Awards. Joy was also nominated as a soloist for the Top 10 Artist of the Year Bonsang (Main Prize) at the 2020 Melon Music Awards, and Artist of the Year Daesang at the 2020 Genie Music Awards.

2021–present: Solo debut, return to acting, and rising popularity 
On May 12, 2021, it was announced that Joy would make her official solo debut with a special album consisting of 6 remake songs from the 1990s to 2000s. Joy's extended play Hello was released on May 31, with the title track reaching number one on multiple charts and the album recording number one on the iTunes Top Album charts of 26 countries. All 6 tracks from the album debuted on the Gaon Digital Chart, with Joy also reaching number one as a soloist on the Melon Female Solo Artist Chart. Joy's title track "Hello" also reached the Top 10 of Billboard's K-Pop Hot 100, with 5 tracks in total from her solo debut album also entering the chart. On November 8, 2021, Joy's solo debut album Hello was nominated for the Album of the Year Daesang (Grand Prize) at the 2021 Melon Music Awards. Joy was also nominated as a soloist for the second consecutive year for the MMA Top 10 Artist Bonsang (Main Prize). On November 27, 2021, Joy was nominated for Artist of the Year (Digital Music - May) at the Gaon Music Awards. In December, Joy was also nominated for the Best Digital Song Bonsang at the 36th Golden Disc Awards, and the Main Award (Bonsang) at the 31st Seoul Music Awards. In addition, NME listed Joy's "Hello" as one of the Top 25 Best K-pop songs of 2021.

On December 20, 2021, Joy made her return to acting in the JTBC drama The One and Only. In 2022, Joy was nominated for Best Actress Idol and Best Variety Idol at the 2022 Brand Customer Loyalty Awards. On May 26, 2022, it was announced that Joy would star in KakaoTV's original drama Once Upon a Small Town, set to premiere worldwide on Netflix on September 5, 2022.

On October 21, 2022, Joy and Wonstein released the single "Love Song" as part of the World Peace Project, with proceeds donated to UNICEF Korea.

Public image

In 2019, Joy ranked in Gallup Korea's annual data list of the Top 20 Most Popular Idols. In another survey conducted among soldiers doing mandatory military service in South Korea, Joy was ranked in the Top 5 most popular female K-pop idols. In their annual list, K-pop Radar also confirmed that Joy's Instagram account _imyour_joy had the most Instagram followers out of K-pop female artists who opened their account in 2019. Joy has also ranked first several times in the "Individual Girl Group Members Brand Power Ranking" published by the Korean Corporate Reputation Research Institute.

In February 2020, Joy was invited as a VIP guest of Michael Kors to attend New York Fashion Week, with Vogue calling Joy "one of K-pop's brightest stars".

As a singer, Joy's voice has received praise from various producers and musicians including composer Hwang Hyun, singer-songwriter You Hee-yeol, and producer Ma Joo-hee. In 2020, Joy became the first SM Female Artist without a solo debut to receive a Bonsang (Main Prize) nomination. In 2021, Joy became the first SM Female Soloist to be nominated for the Album of the Year Daesang (Grand Prize) at the Melon Music Awards.

Other ventures

Endorsements
In July 2018, Joy was named as the new model and dual endorser for Lotte's liquor drink Fitz. In May 2019, eSpoir, of South Korea's leading cosmetics conglomerate Amore Pacific, chose Joy as their official muse for their makeup and skincare products. In 2020, Joy became the face of Aveda South Korea, owned by Estée Lauder, with the brand citing Joy's positive image across various fields. In February 2021, Joy became a muse of Tod's Italian luxury brand, Hogan, and was later officially announced as the new Ambassador for Tod's in Korea on August 13, 2021. In September 2021, Joy became the face and model for Calvin Klein's latest campaign in Korea. In January 2022, Joy was named as a muse of Calvin Klein. In February 2022, Joy became the exclusive model of premium vegan beauty brand, Athé. In March 2022, Joy was announced as the new endorser of Lacto-Joy health products. In July 2022, Joy was announced as the first exclusive model for Alachi Chicken, with the brand stating that Joy was selected for her lively charm and luxurious image.

Philanthropy
In February 2020, Joy donated 10 million won to the Community Chest of Korea to help support those affected by the COVID-19 pandemic in South Korea.

Personal life 
In February 2015, Joy graduated from School of Performing Arts Seoul.

On August 23, 2021, Joy was confirmed to be dating R&B singer-songwriter Crush.

Discography

Extended play

Singles

Soundtrack appearances

Other charted songs

Composition credits

Filmography

Film

Television series

Web series

Television show

Music videos

Awards and nominations

Notes

References

External links

  
 
 

1996 births
Living people
People from Jeju Province
South Korean women pop singers
South Korean child singers
South Korean television actresses
South Korean female idols
South Korean web series actresses
Red Velvet (group) members
School of Performing Arts Seoul alumni
21st-century South Korean singers
21st-century South Korean women singers
Japanese-language singers of South Korea